Coming Around may refer to:

 "Coming Around" (Travis song)
 "The Other One" (song), a Grateful Dead song which uses the phase repeatedly in its chorus
 Comin' Around, a country song by Josh Thompson